Swans Crossing is an American teen drama television series created by Mardee Kravit and Ned Kandel. The series stars Sarah Michelle Gellar, Brittany Daniel, Stacey Moseley, and Eddie Robinson. It aired in syndication from June 29 to September 25, 1992.

Synopsis
The series chronicles the lives of a group of wealthy teenagers living in the seaside town of Swans Crossing. Sydney Rutledge (Sarah Michelle Gellar) was the daughter of the town's mayor, Margaret "Muffy" Rutledge. They lived right next door to the mayor's political rival, Grant Booth, and his family. Sydney had a close but secret friendship with Grant's son, Garrett (Shane McDermott), but the parents found out and built a literal wall between them and their houses. The couple broke up but still stayed in the same social groups, generating a bitter struggle between them as the season progressed.

Other major characters in Swans Crossing were J.T. Adams (Tom Carroll) and Neil Atwater (Eddie Robinson), best friends and scientific geniuses; Bobby "Saja" De Castro (Alex Tanaka); Saja's sister Sophia Eva McCormick De Castro (Mira Sorvino), Sandy Swan (Kristen Mahon) and Owen Fowler (Evan Ferrante), the talented musicians; Jimmy Clayton (Devin Doherty) and Callie Walker (Stacey Moseley), the auto mechanics; Glory Booth (Carisa Dahlbo), Garrett's younger sister and J.T.'s love interest; Nancy Robbins (Kristy Barbera), Sydney's best friend; and Mila Rosnovsky (Brittany Daniel), Garrett's new girlfriend and the daughter of a countess who is an old friend of the Mayor's.

Spies, first loves, phony birth certificates, and the preservation of endangered species, fueled the plots. One major storyline that never got resolved was Garrett blackmailing Sydney with the fact that he could prove she was swapped at birth with Sandy Swan (the birth certificate was phony). After making peace with Callie and Jimmy, they offered to help Sydney find the evidence to help her disprove it. The 65 episode run ended unsuspectingly with a (to be continued) sign, which it never was; leaving a lot of questions unanswered and a lot of viewers confused and disappointed.

Cast

Tom Carroll as J.T. Adams
Carisa Dahlbo as Glory Booth
Brittany Daniel as Mila Rosnovsky
Devin Doherty as Jimmy Clayton
Sarah Michelle Gellar as Sydney Rutledge
Shane McDermott as Garrett Booth
Kristy Barbera as Nancy Robbins
Evan Ferrante as Owen Fowler
Kristen Mahon as Sandy Swan
Stacey Moseley as Callie Walker
Eddie Robinson as Neil Atwater
Alex Tanaka as Bobby "Saja" DeCastro
Ziska Beveridge as Mayor Rutledge
Delphi Harrington as Countess Rosnovsky
William Shanks as Barek
Nick Wyman as Grant Booth #1
John Cunningham as Grant Booth #2
Philip Clark as Coach Cromme
Mira Sorvino as Sophia DeCastro
Donald Symington as Ralph
Laurie Kennedy as Cornelia Booth
Ashley Chapman as Katie Adams
Holter Graham as Billy Gunn
MB Battisti as Jazz

Production
The series, which was created by Ned Kandel and Mardee Kravit, was taped at Kaufman Astoria Studios in Queens, home of Sesame Street and The Cosby Show. The show was filmed on videotape and shot and edited in a way to resemble a daytime soap opera similar to that of shows such as All My Children and The Young and the Restless.

Streaming
In July 2015, executive producer Ned Kandel announced on the show's Facebook fan listing, that the series would be available for streaming soon. On December 4, 2015, both ShoutFactoryTV and Hulu made available for streaming all 65 episodes of the series. As of September 2016, Hulu has removed the series from its streaming library though it is still available on ShoutFactoryTV. The show is also available on the app Tubi.

Merchandising
A Swans Crossing series of action figures and a Rock Concert Playset were produced by Playmates Toys.

Awards and nominations

External links

1992 American television series debuts
1992 American television series endings
1990s American teen drama television series
American television soap operas
English-language television shows
First-run syndicated television programs in the United States
Television series about teenagers
Television shows filmed in New York City